Samantha Ettus (born July 12, 1972) is an American entrepreneur, author, speaker, TV contributor and podcast host. She is the founder and CEO of Park Place Payments, a venture backed fintech company

Early life
Ettus was born and raised in New York City and graduated from the Dalton School. She completed her undergraduate degree in anthropology at Harvard . Ettus returned five years later to earn an MBA at Harvard Business School. Upon graduation, she founded Ettus Media Management, a New York City personal branding agency that represented CEOs and experts.

Business
Ettus started her first business, a personal branding firm, following graduation at Harvard Business School in 2001. Since then she has continued on the entrepreneurial path, most recently with Park Place Payments, a payment processing company. She was recently named to Entrepreneur Magazine's list of 100 Powerful Women of 2021. Ettus sits on the advisory board of the Forbes School of Business and Technology, Sparks and Honey and Inspiro Tequila.

Media
Ettus has hosted 75 episodes of Obsessed TV, an online talk show she co-created with Gary Vaynerchuk in which she interviewed celebrities and athletes including Bethenny Frankel and Al Roker. She has appeared on hundreds of television shows including The Today Show, NBC News, Access Hollywood, CNN, Dr. Phil and The Doctors. Previously, Ettus wrote a syndicated weekly column called "Celebrity Assets" for Scripps Howard. She was the first person quoted in Sheryl Sandberg's bestselling book, Lean In.

Ettus has authored five books: The Experts' Guide to 100 Things Everyone Should Know How to Do, The Experts' Guide to Life at Home, The Experts' Guide to Doing Things Faster, The Experts' Guide to the Baby Years, and The Pie Life.

Ettus' fifth book, The Pie Life: A Guilt-Free Recipe for Success and Satisfaction, was published in September 2016. The Pie Life debuted on Good Morning America and The TODAY Show during the week of its publication.

For four years she hosted a weekly nationally syndicated call-in radio show, and was a contributor to Forbes. She has given hundreds of keynote speeches at conferences, corporations, and universities, including two TEDx talks.

In the fall 2020 Ettus launched What's Her Story With Sam & Amy, a women in business podcast for iHeart Radio, which she co-hosts with entrepreneur Amy Nelson.

Personal life
Ettus is a formerly nationally ranked junior tennis player. She was heavily recruited by universities and competed on the women's tennis team while attending Harvard.,

In 2005, Ettus married Mitch Jacobs at Pan's Garden in Palm Beach, Florida. The couple have three children, Ella Madeline (b. 2006), Ruby (b. 2007) and Bowen Asher (b. 2010) and split their time between Los Angeles and New York.

References

External links

 Official website
 Park Place Payments

1972 births
Living people
Writers from New York City
Harvard Business School alumni
Dalton School alumni